Lambert Nunatak is a rock nunatak that protrudes through the snow mantle of the southeastern Coulter Heights, near the coast of Marie Byrd Land, Antarctica.

References

Nunataks of Marie Byrd Land